John William Kennedy (born 1910, date of death unknown) was a Northern Irish Ulster Unionist politician who was a member of the Parliament of Northern Ireland. He represented Belfast Cromac from 1962 to 1973.

Kennedy was an area supervisor for a tailoring firm and member of Belfast Corporation. He was the founder of the British Sailors Friendly League.  He was the only post-World War II member of the Ulster Unionist Labour Association to sit in the Stormont House of Commons.

Kennedy served as Assistant Whip from 1969 until 1972, also holding the office of Assistant Parliamentary Secretary at the Ministry of Finance from March to May 1969.

References

Sources
Biographies of Members of the Northern Ireland House of Commons
The Government of Northern Ireland

1910 births
Year of death missing
Date of birth missing
Ulster Unionist Party members of the House of Commons of Northern Ireland
Members of the House of Commons of Northern Ireland 1962–1965
Members of the House of Commons of Northern Ireland 1965–1969
Members of the House of Commons of Northern Ireland 1969–1973
Northern Ireland junior government ministers (Parliament of Northern Ireland)
High Sheriffs of Belfast
Members of the House of Commons of Northern Ireland for Belfast constituencies